St. Paul's Secondary School (SPSS) is a Catholic girls' secondary school situated on Ventris Road in Happy Valley, Hong Kong. It is a Catholic grant-in-aid Anglo-Chinese Secondary Grammar School for girls.

History 
St. Paul's Secondary School is a Catholic grant-in-aid Anglo-Chinese secondary grammar school for girls. It was one of the first girls' schools in Hong Kong to offer science subjects and computer studies in the upper forms and computer literacy in the lower forms.
It introduced integrated science in the late 60s, computer studies in the late 70s, computer literacy and family life education in the early 80s and implemented IT in education in the 90s. It was selected as one of the 10 pilot secondary schools in the IT in Education Pilot Scheme in 1998.

To date, it has widened its curriculum and developed itself into a fully integrated educational institute with arts, sciences, commercial and social sciences at all levels.

First foundation 
St. Paul's Secondary School owes its parentage to the Sisters of St. Paul de Chartres who arrived in Hong Kong from France in 1848. They became involved in local education soon after their arrival. They sponsored and ran St. Paul's Convent School in 1854 and their work of educational excellence became well known in Hong Kong.

Second foundation 
St. Paul's Secondary School was founded in 1960 by the Sisters of St. Paul of Chartres as an extension of St. Paul's Convent School to meet the growing needs of science education of girls in Hong Kong at secondary and matriculation levels.

Its former principal, Damian Lai, retired in 2006.

Academics 
There are five classes in each of form 1 to form 6, constituting a total of 30 classes. Most of the form 1 students come from St. Paul's Primary Catholic School and the rest come from other primary schools.

Other Learning Experience 
Under the New Senior Secondary (NSS) Curriculum, 'Other Learning Experiences' (OLE) is one of the three components that complement the NSS subjects. Based on our strong foundation of the five Essential Learning Experiences in the junior forms, senior form students are offered a wide range of OLE opportunities both within and outside school. It is hoped that our Paulinians would be further encouraged to participate in the five areas of OLE, namely Aesthetic Development, Physical Development, Moral and Civic Education, Community Service and Career-related Experiences.

In SPSS, Subject-related Experiences is also included in the OLE Coordination Team to give extra support for activities related to academic learning.
 Mixed Media Painting
 Verse and Play Competition
 Food Bank Project
 Sports Day
 Inter-class Rope Skipping
 Student Reflection Day
 Dress Special Day
 Singing Contest
 Dance Competition
 Painting on Fabrics
 Famine Lunch
 Outdoor Learning Day

School clubs and teams

Subject-related experiences 
 文史學會
 普通話學會
 Computer Club
 English Society
 Home Economics Club
 Liberal Studies Society
 Mathematics Society
 Science Club
 Social Sciences Club

Aesthetic development 
 中文戲劇學會
 中國戲曲興趣小組
 Dance Club
 English Drama Club
 Instrumental Classes
 Music Society
 Photography Club
 School Choir
 School Orchestra
 Visual Arts Club

Physical development 
 Athletics Club
 Badminton Club
 Basketball Club
 Rope Skipping Society
 Swimming Club
 Table Tennis Club
 Volleyball Club

Moral & civic education 
 Green School Working Team
 Legion of Mary (China Praesidium, Miraculous Medal Praesidium)
 Mass Liturgy Group
 Peer Group Counselling Team
 Student Civic Education Team
 Student Moral Education Team
 Young Friends of St. Paul

Community service 
 Community Youth Club
 Ecology & Health Club
 Girl Guides
 Hong Kong Award for Young People
 I.T. Prefect Board
 Prefect Board
 Road Safety Patrol
 Sister School Scheme
 Social Service Society
 SPSS Nursing Cadet Division
 Z-Club

Career-related experiences 
 Campus TV Team
 English Debating Society
 Editorial Board (Yearbook)
 Paulinian Spectrum Editorial Board
 Student Careers Team
 Student Librarian Society
 中文演說及辯論組

School hymn 

Refrain:
Hark! Daughters of the great St. Paul,
Come, listen to his call:
"O children of this loved school,
The loving nurse of all,
Rejoice in God, do work and pray;
Be true from day to day."

Beloved school of mine,
My pains and joys are thine,
My childhood's early dreams
Are closely linked with thee.
The hope that heaven brings
Thou dost unfold to me,
Thou dost unfold to me.

Sweet are the days of girlhood,
When friends we love and care,
Those golden links of childhood,
Whose sympathy we share.
Do stay and while the hours away,
With us in work and play.
And when we leave
Our dear old school
These mem'ries we'll recall,
These mem'ries we'll recall.
(Repeat Refrain)

School facilities 
The whole school is air-conditioned. In addition to standard-sized air-conditioned classrooms, there are well-equipped special rooms including school hall , chapel , Student Activity/Dance Room, Small-group Teaching Room, Computer Rooms, Broadcast Studio , Multi-Media Learning Center(MMLC), Language Laboratory, Biology Laboratory 1 , Biology Laboratory 2 , Integrated Science Laboratory , Physics Laboratory , Chemistry Laboratory , Library , Lecture Room, Multi-Purpose Room, Needlework Room , Home Management Room , Music Room , Art Room , Interview Rooms.

Extra-curricular activities 
Music
SPSS possesses a wide range of musical groups, including the Junior and Intermediate Choirs, a Full Orchestra, as well as a String Orchestra and a Wind Band. The School Intermediate Choir came first with 92 marks in this year's Schools Music Festival: Intermediate Girls Choir Competition Singing in Foreign Language Second Division. The School Junior Choir, out of 27 competitors, came second with 87 marks in this year's Schools Music Festival: Girls Choir Competition Singing in Foreign Language Second Division.

Sports
The School organizes a wide variety of sports teams, including Athletics, Basketball, Volleyball, Badminton, Table Tennis, National Dance, Fencing, Rope Skipping. The School is also actively participate in invitation competition organised by various school.

Basketball team

St. Paul's Secondary School is renowned for its outstanding basketball team. In the year of 2002, a group of devoted basketball players have joined the basketball team and changed the prospect of the team. After spending years of effort, the team won the Overall Champion in the Inter-School Basketball Competition 2006/07 which established the greatest success in the school's sports history.

Since then, the basketball team has achieved the followings in the Division One (HK) Inter-School Basketball Competition:

2008/09 A Grade - 2nd runner-up 

2010/12 B Grade - 2nd runner-up 

Other
Under the NSS Curriculum, 'Other Learning Experiences' (OLE) is one of the three components that complement the NSS subjects. Based on our strong foundation of the five Essential Learning Experiences in the junior forms, senior form students are offered a wide range of OLE opportunities both within and outside school. It is hoped that our Paulinians would be further encouraged to participate in the five areas of OLE, namely Aesthetic Development, Physical Development, Moral and Civic Education, Community Service and Career-related Experiences.
Every year, there are many competitions and activities held in order to provide a learning experience for Paulinians, such as Verse and Play competition and Inter-class Rope Skipping.
SPSS also participates in other competitions, including art, drama and the Hong Kong Schools Speech Festival.

Notable Alumnae 
Political and Legal Industry:

 Dr. Margaret Ng Ngoi-yee: Politician, barrister, writer and columnist. Practising barrister in Hong Kong since 1988. Member of the Legal functional constituency of the Legislative Council of Hong Kong (1998-2012). Former director at Stand News and a former member of Civic Party.
 Pamela Peck: Hong Kong famous columnist, radio host, actor, social activist
 Claudia Mo: Former Legislative Council Member (Kowloon West geographical constituency), former The Standard, TVB and RTHK journalist. Hong Kong media worker, pan-democratic camp politician, and former member of the Civic Party
 Professor Sophia Chan Siu-chee, GBS, JP: Former Secretary for Food and Health Bureau

Professional Sports Industry:

 Siobhán Haughey: Famous Hong Kong swimmer, holder of 10 Hong Kong records. In the 2016 Olympic Games, she became the first Hong Kong swimmer to reach the semi-final of the women's swimming event, and she won the silver medal in the women's 200m freestyle at the 2020 Tokyo Olympics
 Chan Wai Kei: Famous windsurfer, windsurfing gold medalist at the 2009 East Asian Games

Culture, Entertainment and Journalism Industry:

 Sandy Lau Sin Ting: The 2009 Miss Hong Kong champion
 Roxanne Tong Lok Man: 2012 Miss Hong Kong Tourism Ambassador, Beauty Sublimation and Most Popular Pageant, famous female artist and TV actress
 Sisley Choi: Miss Hong Kong 2013 first runner-up, famous female artist and TV drama actor
 Scarlett Wong: Former ViuTV artist and host of a famous Hong Kong show. Sister of actress Jacqueline Wong
 Ada To Man-Wai: Famous stage actress, screenwriter, composer and lyricist
 Emily Kwan Po Wai: Famous TV actor and singer
 Rosa Maria Velasco: Famous stage actress
 Jarita Wan: Famous musical actress
 Ashley Cheung: Winner of the HAF Award at the 2016 Hong Kong International Film and Television Festival
 Gladys Li Ching Kwan: Model and actor
 JuJu Chan Szeto: Hong Kong singer-songwriter, female action actress, taekwondo athlete, film producer, 2009 Miss Chinatown America
 Wancy Tai: Hong Kong female singer
 Kristy Shaw: Miss Hong Kong 2021 runner-up and Miss Friendship
 Lam Tze Wing, Nora: Director
 Sinnie Ng: member of the girl group Lolly Talk
 Peace Lo: Member of SENZA A Cappella
 Billie Ho: Independent folk singer-songwriter
 Maggie Leung: Director

Associated schools 
Other sister schools:
 St. Paul's Convent School
 St. Paul's School (Lam Tin)
 St Paul's International College (Australia)

See also 
 Education in Hong Kong
 List of secondary schools in Hong Kong

References

External links 
 
 Past Students Association 

Happy Valley, Hong Kong
Girls' schools in Hong Kong
Secondary schools in Hong Kong
Catholic secondary schools in Hong Kong
Educational institutions established in 1960
1960 establishments in Hong Kong